The Satellite Award for Best Genre Series, first handed out in 2011, is an annual award given by the International Press Academy as one of its Satellite Awards.

Winners and nominees

2010s

2020s

References

External links	
 Official website

Television Series - Genre